Nowabad (also Romanized as Nowābād) is a village in Hangam Rural District, in the Central District of Qir and Karzin County, Fars Province, Iran. At the 2006 census its population was 275 with 62 families.

References 

Populated places in Qir and Karzin County